Mother of Mine is a 2019 South Korean television series starring Kim Hae-sook, Kim So-yeon, Kim Ha-kyung, Park Geun-soo, Nam Tae-boo and Choi Myung-gil. The series aired on KBS2 every Saturday and Sunday from 19:55 to 21:15 (KST) from March 23 to September 22, 2019 for 108 episodes.

Synopsis
While running a small beef soup restaurant, Park Seon-ja (Kim Hae-sook) raised her three daughters Kang Mi-seon (Yoo Sun), Kang Mi-ri (Kim So-yeon) and Kang Mi-hye (Kim Ha-kyung) alone. She still runs the restaurant to this day and her three daughters are now all grown up. Seon-Ja's first daughter Mi-seon is married and she has a daughter. Mi-seon is busy working and taking care of her family. Second daughter Mi-ri cares about her mother a lot. She is confident in herself and good at her job. Mi-ri gets involved in a romantic relationship with her co-worker Han Tae-joo (Hong Jong-hyun). He is the oldest son of the family that owns the company. The youngest daughter is Mi-Hye. She used to be a promising novelist, but she is not any more. She helps her mother at the restaurant.

Cast

Main
 Kim Hae-sook as Park Seon-ja
 Mother of Kang Mi-seon, Kang Mi-ri, and Kang Mi-hye. She own and runs an Ox Bone soup restaurant.
 Choi Myung-gil as Jeon In-sook
 Biological mother of Kang Mi-ri and Step-aunt of Han Tae-joo. She is the new CEO of HS Apparel. 
 Kim So-yeon as Kang Mi-ri / Kang Seung-yeon
 Adopted daughter/Niece of Park Seon-ja and Biological daughter of Jeon In-sook. She works for HS Apparel. 
 Yoo Sun as Kang Mi-seon
 Park Seon-ja's oldest daughter. She works in a bank.
 Kim Ha-kyung as Kang Mi-hye
 Park Seon-ja's youngest daughter. She is a former novelist.
 Park Geun-soo as Park Yeong-dal
 Park Seon-ja's younger brother and uncle of Kang Mi-seon, Kang Mi-ri, and Kang Mi-hye. He works in his sister restaurant.
 Nam Tae-boo as Bang Jae-beom
 A successful drama screenwriter and Kang Mi-hye's ex-boyfriend.
 Hong Jong-hyun as Han Tae-joo
 Newly recruited employee at HS Apparel and Kang Mi-ri's love interest. He is secretly the oldest son of HS Group's chairman

Supporting

Han Cheon Ox Bone Soup Restaurant
 Jo Seung-wook as Min-woo 
 Part-timer working in the restaurant.

HS Group
 Dong Bang-woo as Han Jong-soo
 Chairman of HS Group. Han Tae-joo and Han Tae-ho's father.
 Kang Sung-yeon as Na Hye-mi
 Han Jong-soo's second wife who is a retired actress.
 Choi Jae-won as Na Do-jin
 Na Hye-mi's older brother.
 Lee Ro-woon as Han Tae-ho
 Han Jong-soo and Na Hye-mi's son and Han Tae-joo's much younger half-brother.

Kang Mi-seon's family
 Joo Hyun as Jeong Dae-cheol
 Kang Mi-seon's father-in-law.
 Park Jung-soo as Ha Mi-ok
 Kang Mi-seon's mother-in-law.
 Lee Won-jae as Jeong Jin-soo
 Kang Mi-seon's husband and Jang Da-bin's father.
 Joo Ye-rim as Jeong Da-bin
 Kang Mi-seon and Jeong Jin-soo's only daughter.

Doldamgil Publishing
 Ki Tae-young as Kim Woo-jin
 Doldamgil Publishing's Chief editor and Kang Mi-hye's love interest.
 Han Ki-woong as Peter Park
 Doldamgil Publishing's employee and Kim Woo-jin's old friend.
 Lee Da-hae as Seo Hee-Jin
 Kim Woo-jin’s ex-wife and a book designer.

HS Group Marketing and Strategy Department
 Kim Wang-geun as Kim Seung-cheol
 Jo Young-hoon as Park Tae-ho
 Lee Tae-yeon as Lee Min-joo
 Jo Joo-won as Park Ji-soo
 Kim Yeo-jin as Jo Min-hye

The Bank
 Kim Se-dong as Park Haeng-woon
 Joo In-young as Seo Kyung-jin
 Yang Eo-jin as Park Min-ji
 Yoon Bo-mi as Han Na-young

Special appearances
 Joo Hyun-mi as Wang Wei
 Han Da-sol as Jeong So-hee
 Lee Sang-woo as Mi-ri's blind date 
 Ko Kyu-pil as police officer (ep. #3)
 Lee Hwang-ui as Woo-jin's father
 Lee Mi-young as pharmacist
 Kim Gi-ha as Yeong-dal's friend

Viewership
 In this table,  represent the lowest ratings and  represent the highest ratings.
 N/A denotes that the rating is not known.
The last episode has more than 6.2 million views.

Awards and nominations

Remake
This series is remade in Vietnam as Thương ngày nắng về, aired on government-owned VTV3 in 2021.

Notes

References

External links
  
 

Korean Broadcasting System television dramas
2019 South Korean television series debuts
2019 South Korean television series endings
Korean-language television shows
Television series about families